Camillo Rama (1586 – c. 1627) was an Italian painter, active in his native city of Brescia.

He was the  pupil of Palma il Giovane, and painted several altarpieces in Brescia. He also painted works for the refectory of the Carmelites, and for the churches of San Giuseppe and San Francesco. In 1610, he also painted for the Stanze of the Palazzo del Capitano in Brescia.

He died in Brescia.

References

Year of death missing
16th-century Italian painters
Italian male painters
17th-century Italian painters
Italian Baroque painters
Painters from Brescia
1586 births